This is a list of specialist hospitals for treatment of cancer'.

Cancer Hospitals

 Australia 

 Peter MacCallum Cancer Centre
 Princess Margaret Cancer Centre
 Victorian Comprehensive Cancer Centre

 Bangladesh 

 National Institute of Cancer Research and Hospital

 Brazil 

 Institute of Cancer of São Paulo

 China 

 Fuda Cancer Hospital-Guangzhou
 Shanghai Cancer Center
 Sun Yat-sen University Cancer Center
 Zhejiang Cancer Hospital 

 Denmark 

 Finsen Laboratory

 Egypt 

 Borg El Arab University Hospital
 Children's Cancer Hospital Egypt
 National Cancer Institute

 Finland 

 Docrates Cancer Center

 France Hôpital Saint-Louis – founded in Rheims in 1742.  This was the first cancer hospital in the world.   It was initially on the Rue de Saint-Denis with two beds funded by a bequest of the canon, Jean Godinot.Oeuvres du Calvaire'' – founded in Lyons in 1850 for women

India

Japan 

 Cancer Institute Hospital of JFCR
 Kanagawa Cancer Center

Jordan 

 King Hussein Cancer Center

Pakistan 

 Institute of Nuclear Medicine, Oncology and Radiotherapy
 Institute of Radiotherapy and Nuclear Medicine

 Karachi Institute of Radiotherapy and Nuclear Medicine

 Nuclear Medicine, Oncology and Radiotherapy Institute

 Shaukat Khanum Memorial Cancer Hospital and Research Centre

Singapore 

 Raffles Hospital
 Parkway East Hospital - Parkway Cancer Centre
 Gleneagles Hospital - Parkway Cancer Centre
 Tan Tock Seng Hospital
 Singapore General Hospital
 KK Women's and Children's Hospital
 Mount Elizabeth Hospital - Parkway Cancer Centre
 National Cancer Centre
 National University Hospital
 Changi General Hospital

Sri Lanka 

 National Cancer Institute

Sweden 

 Radiumhemmet

United Kingdom 

Royal Marsden Hospital – founded in Westminster in 1851 as the Free Cancer Hospital – the first in the UK
Christie Hospital – founded in Manchester in 1892 as the Cancer Pavilion and Home for Incurables
Velindre Cancer Centre

United States 

New York Cancer Hospital – founded in 1884 as the first cancer hospital in the USA
Alvin J. Siteman Cancer Center
Cancer Treatment Centers of America, Atlanta - Opened in 2012 in Goodyear, Arizona
Cancer Treatment Centers of America, Chicago - Opened in 1988 in Zion, Illinois
Cancer Treatment Centers of America, Downtown Chicago - Opened in 2018 in Chicago, Illinois
Cancer Treatment Centers of America, Gurnee - Opened in 2018 in Gurnee, Illinois
Cancer Treatment Centers of America, Philadelphia - Opened in 2005 in Philadelphia, Pennsylvania
Cancer Treatment Centers of America, Phoenix - Opened in 2008 in Gilbert, Arizona
Cancer Treatment Centers of America, Gilbert - Opened in 2018 in Phoenix, Arizona
Cancer Treatment Centers of America, North Phoenix - Opened in 2018 in Phoenix, Arizona
Cancer Treatment Centers of America, Scottsdale - Opened in 2018 in Scottsdale, Arizona
Cancer Treatment Centers of America, Tulsa - Opened in 1990 in Tulsa, Oklahoma
Cross Cancer Institute

Zimbabwe 

 Oncocare

References

Cancer hospitals
Cancer